Pressure Point is the second album by the English electronic group Freestylers, released in 2001. The album contains singles such as "Get Down Massive", "Told You So" and "Weekend Song".

Track listing

In the 2002 US release, some tracks have altered durations (especially 3 & 10) and tracks 2-4 & 11-12 have changed their order of appearance.

References

Freestylers albums
2001 albums